Anillidius is a genus of beetles in the family Carabidae, containing the following species:

 Anillidius byzantinus Casale, M. Elonti & Giachino, 1992
 Anillidius coiffaiti Jeannel, 1955
 Anillidius hobhousae Jeannel, 1930
 Anillidius pisidicus Jeannel, 1937
 Anillidius tauricus Jeannel, 1930
 Anillidius turcicus J. Frivaldszky, 1880
 Anillidius uludagensis Schweiger, 1965

References

Trechinae